Marjetka "Neca" Falk (born 19 June 1950) is a Slovenian pop singer. She was born in Maribor, a city in Slovenian Styria. She started her career at the Youth Festival in Tivoli Hall in 1969 and released her first album, Danes (English: Today), in 1977. She is well known for her chansons and for her children's songs about cats, written by Kajetan Kovič. She also collaborated with Alfi Nipič, Bojan Adamič, Andrej Šifrer, Tomaž Domicelj, Atomsko sklonište, and others.

Hits 
 Prva ljubezen (First Love; Vesela jesen [Merry Autumn], 1972)
 Kako sva si različna (How Different We Are; with Alfi Nipič)
 Dobro jutro, dober dan (Good Morning, Good Afternoon)
 Banane (Bananas)
 Vsi ljudje hitijo (All People Hurry)
 Dravski most (Banks of the Ohio) (The Drava Bridge)
 Maček Muri (Magic Muri, Tomcat Tom, Muri the Cat)
 Muca Maca (Pussy Cat)

Discography

Albums
Danes (Today, Helidon 1977)
Vsi Ijudje hitijo (All People Hurry, RTV LJ, 1978)
Zlata ladja (Golden Ship, 1978)
Najjači ostaju (The Strongest Stay, RTV LJ, 1980)
Nervozna (Nervous, RTV LJ, 1981)
Maček Muri in Muca Maca (Magic Muri and Pussy Cat, 1984)
Maček Muri in Muca Maca (Magic Muri and Pussy Cat, Mačji disk [Cat's Disk], 1992. A cassette and a videocassette)(re-release)
Neca Falk (Mačji disk [Cat's Disk], 1993)(re-release)
Dravski most (The Drava Bridge; Mačji disk [Cat's Disk], 1994)(re-release)
Zlata ladja (Golden Ship; Mačji disk [Cat's Disk], 1994)(re-release)
Portreti (Portraits; Mačji disk [Cat's Disk], 1996)(greatest hits)

References

1950 births
Living people
Slovenian pop singers
Slovenian singer-songwriters
20th-century Slovenian women singers
Musicians from Maribor
Yugoslav women singers
21st-century Slovenian women singers